Iota Cephei (ι Cephei, ι Cep) is a star in the northern constellation Cepheus. The star is visible to the naked eye with an apparent visual magnitude of 3.5.

It is a K-type giant star with a stellar classification of K0 III. It is currently at an evolutionary stage known as the red clump, indicating that it is generating energy through the fusion of helium at its core. It has 11 times the Sun's radius and about 2.15 times the mass of the Sun. Its luminosity is 57 times that of the Sun, and its surface has an effective temperature of 4,768 K.

Pole star

Iota Cephei is located within 5° of the precessional path traced across the celestial sphere by the Earth's North pole. In about 3,000 years, it will be one of the closest visible stars to the celestial north pole, along with Alfirk which will also be within 5° of the precessional path, on the other side.

References

K-type giants
Horizontal-branch stars
Northern pole stars
Cephei, Iota
Cepheus (constellation)
Durchmusterung objects
Cephei, 32
216228
112724
8694